Luanda is a market town in the Vihiga County of Kenya, located along the Kisumu-Busia highway. It was one of the administrative divisions in Emuhaya district between 2007 and 2009. Luanda has grown  over the past ten years with several banks, and supermarkets establishing within the locality. Luanda serves as the main town for Emuhaya and Luanda subcounties. The predominant tribe in Luanda are the Banyore people.

Geography 

Luanda is located a few kilometers from the Equator at Maseno, its geographical coordinates being 0° 0' 0" North, 34° 35' 0" East. , The town has a population of 13,319 people and is a significant business point in Bunyore.

Elevation is 1501 m.

Transport 

It is also a transit point for road travellers connecting to various towns in Western Kenya. Major bus routes via Luanda include the Luanda-Maseno-Kisumu, Luanda-Siaya, Yala-Busia, Maseno-Kisumu, Ebwiranyi-Kombewa, Luanda-Emusire, Esiandumba-Akala-Bondo, Kima-Vihiga, Luanda-Kakamega, Mwichio-Emusire and Luanda-Yala through Es'saba, HaBuchichi and Ebuyangu.

See also 
 Railway stations in Kenya

References 

Vihiga County
Populated places in Kenya